The USC Suzanne Dworak-Peck School of Social Work at the University of Southern California, was founded in 1920 as USC's School of Social Work. The school's only location is in Los Angeles, California.

According to school officials, the facility entertains 114 faculty teaching an estimated 3,500 enrolled students, making the Dworak-Peck School the largest school for social work in the world. This means roughly 1 of every 20 graduate-level social workers in the country graduated from the school.  It also has the oldest MSW and PhD of Social Work programs in the West.

The school was renamed the USC Suzanne Dworak-Peck School of Social Work in 2016, after USC alumnus Suzanne Dworak-Peck donated $60 million to the school. It is the largest donation ever to a school of social work.

The program was ranked #25 by the 2019 U.S. News & World Report Best Colleges Ranking, and offers a Doctor of Social Work degree, as well as a Master of Social Work degree.

The California Social Work Hall of Distinction was established in 2002 to honor those involved in bringing about the betterment of society and to ensure that the contributions of social work leaders, innovators and pioneers would be recognized and preserved for the future. It is located in the Montgomery Ross Fisher building on USC campus.

Notable alumni
Laura Chick, California Inspector General
Doria Ragland, Yoga instructor, social worker, and mother of Meghan, Duchess of Sussex
Ira Wohl, Academy Award winner for his 1979 film, Best Boy
Karen Bass, Mayor-elect of Los Angeles, Member of the House of Representatives from California's 37th congressional district

References

University of Southern California
Schools of social work in the United States